The Donora Smog Museum features a collection of archival materials documenting the Donora Smog of 1948, an air inversion of smog containing fluorine that killed 20 people in Donora, Pennsylvania, United States, a mill town 20 miles south of Pittsburgh on the Monongahela River. 

Donora was home to U.S. Steel's Donora Zinc Works and its American Steel & Wire plant. The event is sometimes credited for initiating the clean-air movement in the United States, whose crowning achievement was the Clean Air Act.

The museum, which opened October 20, 2008, is located at 595 McKean Avenue near Sixth Street in an old storefront.

The museum has partnered with California University of Pennsylvania to develop a digital collection of primary sources that are archived on site.

See also 
 Great Smog of 1952

References 
 Commonwealth of Pennsylvania, Department of Environmental Protection. Overview of the 1948 Donora Smog
 Don Hopey (2008). Museum remembers Donora's deadly 1948 smog: story by Pittsburgh Post-Gazette. Retrieved October 21, 2008.

External links 
 Official Website
 Donora Smog Commemorative Committee
 The Donora Digital Collection

Environmental disasters in the United States
History museums in Pennsylvania
Industry museums in Pennsylvania
Museums in Washington County, Pennsylvania
Natural disaster museums
Smog
Museums established in 2008
2008 establishments in Pennsylvania